"Boys & Girls" is a song recorded by French DJ and record producer Martin Solveig featuring Canadian synthpop group Dragonette. It was released on 28 September 2009 as the first single from the reissue of Solveig's third studio album, C'est la Vie (2008), subtitled the Definitive Edition (2009). The song also appears on Solveig's fourth studio album, Smash (2011), and as a bonus track on the Australian edition of Dragonette's second studio album, Fixin to Thrill (2009).

Music video
The music video for "Boys & Girls" was directed by Tristan Séguéla and shot at French fashion designer Jean Paul Gaultier's boutique in Paris, with Gaultier himself making a cameo appearance. In the video, Solveig and Dragonette lead singer Martina Sorbara are seen dancing with several men and women wearing black and white clothes. At one point, Solveig chases Sorbara to the rooftop of the boutique overlooking Paris, where they dance for a while.

Track listings
French CD single and digital download
"Boys & Girls" (Original Edit) – 3:44
"Boys & Girls" (Extended) – 6:23
"Boys & Girls" (David E. Sugar Remix – MS Edit) – 5:29
"Boys & Girls" (Les Petits Pilous Remix) – 4:29
"Boys & Girls" (Laidback Luke Remix) – 5:38

Beatport digital download
"Boys & Girls" (Original Edit) – 3:44
"Boys & Girls" (Extended Mix) – 6:24
"Boys & Girls" (Laidback Luke Remix) – 5:38
"Boys & Girls" (Laidback Luke Dub Mix) – 5:39
"Boys & Girls" (Bart B More Dans Tes Rave Remix) – 6:48
"Boys & Girls" (Bart B More Siren's Call Remix) – 6:19
"Boys & Girls" (Les Petits Pilous Remix) – 4:28
"Boys & Girls" (David E. Sugar Remix – MS Edit) – 5:30

Italian 12" single
A1. "Boys & Girls" (Extended Mix) – 6:24
A2. "Boys & Girls" (Bart B More Dans Tes Rave Remix) – 6:48
B1. "Boys & Girls" (Laidback Luke Remix) – 5:38
B2. "Boys & Girls" (Laidback Luke Dub) – 5:38

Personnel
Credits adapted from CD single liner notes.

 Martin Solveig – songwriting, production, composition, lead vocals, backing vocals, all instruments, programming
 Dragonette – lead vocals, backing vocals
 Philippe Weiss – mixing (Studio Davout, Paris)
 Tom Coyne – mastering (Sterling Sound, New York City)

Charts

Release history

References

External links
 

2009 singles
2009 songs
Martin Solveig songs
Dragonette songs
Mercury Records singles
Songs written by Martin Solveig
Song recordings produced by Martin Solveig